Aplocheiloidei is a suborder of the order Cyprinodontiformes consisting of three families which are commonly known as killifishes.

Families
The three families within the suborder Aplocheiloidei are:

 Aplocheilidae Bleeker, 1859
 Nothobranchiidae Garman, 1895
 Rivulidae Myers, 1925

Proposed taxonomy
Some authorities have lumped the three families into a single family, Aplocheilidae, a well-established name, chosen for its stability in usage over time, and to avoid the impact of a new name at the family rank for a popular aquarium fish group. Under this proposal, the Aplocheilidae includes three subfamilies: Aplocheilinae for the species from Asia, Madagascar and the Seychelles; Cynolebiinae (called Rivulidae above) for the species from the Americas; and Nothobranchiinae for the species from the African mainland.

References 

Cyprinodontiformes
Taxa named by Lynne R. Parenti